Kashirin is a Russian masculine surname, its feminine counterpart is Kashirina. Notable people with the surname include:

Tatiana Kashirina (born 1991), Russian weightlifter
Yury Kashirin (born 1959), Russian cyclist 

Russian-language surnames